James Jack (6 December 1910 – 28 February 1987) was a Scottish trade union leader.

Jack grew up in Blantyre, South Lanarkshire and attended St John's Grammar School in Hamilton.  He was elected as General Secretary of the Scottish Trades Union Congress (STUC) in 1963, and served until 1975.  Following his retirement, he served on a large number of committees, including the Scottish Development Agency, Scottish Oil Development Council, and the Employment Appeal Tribunal.  He stepped down from the last of these positions in 1983, and died four years later.

References

1910 births
1987 deaths
General Secretaries of the Scottish Trades Union Congress
People from Blantyre, South Lanarkshire